The Musalman is the oldest Urdu-language daily newspaper published from Chennai in India. It is an evening paper with four pages, all of which are handwritten by calligraphers, before being mass-produced with a printing press. According to Wired and The Times of India, The Musalman is possibly the only surviving handwritten newspaper in the world.

History

The newspaper was founded by Syed Azmathullah in 1927. It was inaugurated by Dr. Mukhtar Ahmed Ansari, the president of the Madras session of the Indian National Congress. The newspaper's office has been located at the Triplicane High Road in Chennai.

After Syed Azmathullah's death, the newspaper was edited by his son Syed Fazlullah, who died on 26 April 2008, at the age of 78. In 2007, Fazullah had expressed fear that the calligraphy might die with him, since his sons were not interested in carrying on the calligraphy tradition.

Syed Fazlullah's son Syed Arifullah is the chief editor as of April 2018.

The team

The calligraphers, known as katibs, work in a little corner of an 800 square ft. one-room office. They don't have many facilities — only two wall fans, three bulbs and a tube light. As of 2008, the calligraphy team consists of one man and two women, who work almost three hours on each page of the hand-written newspaper. The hand-written product is processed onto a photo negative and mass-produced with a printing press.

As of 2007, Rahman Husseini is the chief katib (copywriter) of the paper. He joined the newspaper as an accountant, and took over as the katib, when the then chief katib died in 1980. In 2007, Rahman Husseni earned ₹2,500 a month, while the other katibs Shabana and Khurshid earned ₹60 a day per page.

The chief reporter is Chinnaswamy Balasubramaniam, who has been with the newspaper for past 20 years and Syed Gulam Murthuza has been the marketing manager who has served the paper for more than 35+ years. The newspaper has correspondents all over India, including New Delhi, Kolkata, and Hyderabad.

The newspaper's office often hosts renowned poets, religious leaders and royalty, some of whom contribute to the pages.

Format 

The newspaper consists of four pages. The front page is for national and international news, the second and the third pages are for local news, and the fourth page is for sports. Some space is left blank at the bottom right corner of the front page, in case there is some breaking news.

As of April 2018, the paper is sold for 75 paise a copy, and has around 21,000 subscribers.

References

External links 
 The Musalman - Preservation of a Dream, YouTube
 The Last Calligraphers, A film by Premjit Ramachandran
 Photos by Scott Carney, Wired News.

Musalman
Works of calligraphy
Islamic calligraphy
Evening newspapers published in India
Mass media in Chennai
1927 establishments in India
Publications established in 1927
Daily newspapers published in India